Ma Wan is an island of Hong Kong, located between Lantau Island and Tsing Yi Island, with an area of . Administratively, it is part of Tsuen Wan District.

The Lantau Link that passes through Ma Wan was constructed in the mid-1990s as part of the Hong Kong Government's Rose Garden plan to connect the new Hong Kong International Airport to the city centre. Its development fostered plans to develop the island. Today, a large part of Ma Wan is occupied by the Park Island apartment complex. A theme park, named Ma Wan Park was built to accompany the housing project, with its first phase opened on 1 July 2007.

Geography

Its highest point is Tai Leng Tau in the southeast. Two channels separate Ma Wan and other major islands.
 to the east is the Ma Wan Channel, separating it from Tsing Yi Island. The channel is crossed by the Tsing Ma Bridge.
 to the southwest is Kap Shui Mun, separating it from the Tsing Chau Tsai Peninsula of Lantau Island. The channel is crossed by the Kap Shui Mun Bridge.
 the north seafront is opposite Tsing Lung Tau and Sham Tseng on the mainland Tsuen Wan District, part of the New Territories.
 The south faces the small Tang Lung Chau island.

Geology
Ma Wan surface rocks are mostly volcanic rocks called Yim Tin Tsai Formation. This is a coarse ash crystal tuff containing lapilli. Some layers of fine volcanic ash are found in the far north of the island. The contained mafic minerals are biotite and amphibole. The tuff contains mostly quartz and alkali and plagioclase feldspar. Other minerals include apatite, magnetite, monazite and zircon.

The Ma Wan granite is fine grained. It contains microcline, and few feldspar phenocrysts. The main minerals are quartz, perthitic orthoclase, and plagioclase. The dark mineral is mostly biotite. Also contained is zircon, fluorite, and allanite. It is found on the south of the east coast.

Dykes formed later with a mafic dyke injected first followed by a felsic material. A feldsparphyric dyke crosses the island east–west near the ferry pier.

Several Cenozoic age quartzphyric rhyolite dykes cross the island. These are also injected with narrow dacitic dykes, and last of all very fine grained mafic basaltic dykes.

A north east trending fault crosses Ma Wan from the typhoon shelter on the west side to the Tun Wan. The island is separated from Lantau Island by a fault under the channel called the Kap Shui Mun Fault. This is angled to the North West, and has its direction controlled by the major tectonic zone it is in called the Linhua Shan Fault System that extends from the coast of Guangdong to Fujian.

Prominent joints are at 85° parallel to the dykes. Other joints are close to horizontal, can cause rocks to form sheets.

History

Remains have been found from the Mid-Neolithic Age (about 3000 BC), the late Neolithic Age (about 2000 BC), the early to late Bronze Age of coastal South China (1500–500 BC), the period of the Warring States to the Han dynasty (206 BC −220 AD), the Tang dynasty (618–917 AD) and the Qing dynasty (1644–1911 AD).

In 1997, a joint excavation by the Antiquities and Monuments Office and the Institute of Archaeology of the Chinese Academy of Social Sciences found complete Neolithic human skeletal remains in tombs at the Tung Wan Tsai North site. 20 tombs were found spanning from the late Neolithic to the early Bronze Age.

The prehistoric island had late neolithic inhabitants as proved by recent excavations. There were also inhabitants here during the Han dynasty.

Foreign visitors first arrived on the island in 1794.

Ma Wan once had a Customs house, still recorded by a stone monument named "Kowloon Gate" monument. (near the old Rural Committee building). It ceased activity on 4 October 1899. Similar custons stations had been established at Fat Tau Chau amd Cheung Chau.

24 housing units were donated and built by the United States in 1965, built on a top of a hill near the Fishermen's Association.

In the early 1970s, the island across from Ma Wan was occupied by three families. Their family names were Woo, Pang, and Woo. The children of these families attended the kindergarten and Fong Yuen School in Ma Wan. Water transportation to Ma Wan was signalled by waving a flag at the pier. The Woo family sustained a living by fishing and creating baskets. The Pang family sustained a living by raising chickens and ducks.

As of 1995, fish farming was the predominant economic activity on Ma Wan.

Ma Wan had a population of 800 in 2000. With the development of the Park Island apartment complex, villagers were rehoused in the northern part of the island.

Features

Park Island
Park Island is a private housing estate that was mainly developed by Sun Hung Kai Properties as part of the Ma Wan Development joint venture project and completed from 2002 to 2006 in six phases.

Villages
 Ma Wan Town, also known as Ma Wan Main Street Village, is a former fishing village with stilt houses (pang uk). It has been vacated.
 Ma Wan Fishermen's Village aka. Ma Wan CARE Village. It has been vacated.
 250-year-old village, quite empty —The new Tin Liu Village has been built a bit on top of it.
 The new villages are:
Ma Wan Main Street Village Central
Ma Wan Main Street Village East
Ma Wan Main Street Village South
Ma Wan Main Street Village
Tin Liu New Village

Ma Wan Main Street Village and Tin Liu are recognized villages under the New Territories Small House Policy.

Leisure
 Ma Wan Park
 The Heritage Centre in Ma Wan Park exhibits the evolution of the island since Neolithic to nowadays, includes a Tang dynasty mud kiln and a Qing dynasty brick kiln found on Ma Wan, and replicas of the late Neolithic skeletons.
 Noah's Ark Museum in Ma Wan Park
 Ma Wan Tung Wan Beach is managed by the Leisure and Cultural Services Department.

Religion
 Annual traditional festivals, such as Tin Hau.
 There are two Tin Hau Temples on Ma Wan. One has been rebuilt on the northern beach and is said to have been originally built by the local pirate Cheung Po Tsai, who often looked after the locals. Another one is located at the Ma Wan Main Street Village.
 Ma Wan Alliance Church

Education
 Kei Wai Primary School
Creative Kindergarten

Culture
 Cantonese Opera productions.
 Local production of the shrimp paste "habe"
 Fong Yuen Study Hall, formerly the Chan Study Hall, was first built by the Chan clan of Tin Liu before the 1900s. The Chan Study Hall was rebuilt with Western influence and renamed as "Fong Yuen Study Hall", literally meaning a nice place for study, in the 1920s to 1930s. (See Revitalising Historic Buildings Through Partnership Scheme)

Others
 Clear water wells
 Deep waters (for Hong Kong) surrounding – 
 Popular photography site.
 Small red crabs.
 Cemetery on the south side.
 The Salvation Army Ma Wan Youth Camp

Infrastructure

 Tsing Ma Bridge, world's longest span suspension bridge carrying both road and railway traffic. Tsing Ma Bridge, Ma Wan Viaduct, and Kap Shui Mun Bridge together link Tsing Yi island to Lantau Island and form the Lantau Link.
 Park Island Ferry Pier

Transport

Road
Although the Hong Kong government originally claimed it would be "physically impossible" to give the island a road connection via the Lantau Link, this was disproved with the beginning of construction of Park Island. The island is now connected to Tsing Yi by the Tsing Ma Bridge (a suspension bridge), and to Lantau Island by the Kap Shui Mun Bridge (a cable-stayed bridge). Both bridges are part of the Lantau Link.

Park Island Transport Co., Ltd. operates bus services from Park Island to Tsing Yi MTR station, Kwai Fong Metroplaza, Hong Kong International Airport, Tsuen Wan West and Tsuen Wan (close to the Tsuen Wan MTR station).

Starting from 3 July 2008, urban taxi were permitted access into Ma Wan during the period between 8 pm and 7 am the following morning to meet residents' transport needs. Starting from 14 December 2012, urban taxi were permitted access into Ma Wan 24 hours daily.

Private vehicles are generally not permitted to enter the island, an arrangement which also exists in Discovery Bay on the nearby Lantau Island; however a permit can be requested from the Transport Department of Hong Kong. Minibuses are not allowed, but the Park Island management company operates cars in case of emergency or special situations, though their availability is not guaranteed. Lorries may enter the island between 10 am to 4 pm daily without the need for a special permit.

Water
There are several ferry piers on the island: Park Island Ferry Pier on the northeast, one on the old Tin Liu village on the west (formerly hosting Sham Tseng ferries), Man Wan Public Pier on the southwest at Ma Wan Main Street Village, Tai Pai Tsui Pier on the south of the island facing Tang Lung Chau, one on the north of the island used for the garbage removal, one on the southeast side (but on a Government land not open).

Park Island Transport Co., Ltd. operates ferry services between Park Island and Central Piers (Pier 2). Another route to Tsuen Wan Pier (near West Rail Tsuen Wan West station) was discontinued on 13 December 2012 after 10 years of operation.

Education
Ma Wan is in Primary One Admission (POA) School Net 62, which includes schools in Tsuen Wan and areas nearby. The net includes multiple aided schools and one government school, Hoi Pa Street Government Primary School.

References

Further reading

External links

 Delineation of area of existing village Ma Wan Main Street (Ma Wan) for election of resident representative (2019 to 2022)
 Delineation of area of existing village Tin Liu (Ma Wan) for election of resident representative (2019 to 2022)
 Photos of Ma Wan's abandoned town
 Ma Wan Blog featuring photos and information on Park Island
 "The road to salvation", a brief history of Ma Wan
 R.J. Sewell & J. W.C. James, Geology of North Lantau Island and Ma Wan, Geotechnical Engineering Office, Civil Engineering Department, Hong Kong, November 1995

 
Restricted areas of Hong Kong red public minibus
Populated places in Hong Kong
Islands of Hong Kong